The Ministry of State Security (MSS or Guóānbù; ;) is the principal civilian intelligence, security and secret police agency of the People's Republic of China, responsible for counterintelligence, foreign intelligence and political security. The MSS is active in industrial espionage and adept at cyber espionage. Its military counterpart is the Intelligence Bureau of the Joint Staff Department. Described as one of the most secretive intelligence organizations in the world, it is headquartered in Beijing with subordinate branches at the provincial, city, municipality and township levels throughout China.

Today's MSS began as the Chinese Communist Party's Central Special Branch until it was replaced by the Central Social Affairs Department (SAD) in 1936. In 1955, the Social Affairs Department was replaced by the Central Investigation Department (CID), China's primary civilian intelligence organization from 1955 to 1983 and the MSS's immediate predecessor. The MSS was created in 1983 with the merging of the CID and the counterintelligence elements of the Ministry of Public Security (MPS).

Overview 
MSS functions as China's intelligence, security and secret police agency. A document from the U.S. Department of Justice described the agency as being like a combination of the Central Intelligence Agency (CIA) and Federal Bureau of Investigation (FBI). Author Clive Hamilton described it as being similar to an amalgamation of the Australian Security Intelligence Organisation (ASIO) and the Australian Secret Intelligence Service (ASIS) "with a lot more power and less subject to the constraints of the rule of law." The stated mission of the MSS is to ensure "the security of the country through effective measures against enemy agents, spies, and counter-revolutionary activities designed to sabotage, destabilize or overthrow China's socialist system."

After the introduction of market elements in the Chinese economy in the early 1980s (leading to a hybrid economic system that includes Soviet-style economic planning and large-scale state ownership existing alongside a significant private sector) and especially after the end of the Cold War, many foreign analysts described the Communist "Party–State" and its security agencies as being left without a real ideology, relying only on repression and the stoking of Chinese nationalism; more recent works, however, highlight the increasing importance of Marxism–Leninism in the worldview, internal culture and self-image of the CCP security apparatus; Vladimir Lenin and Mao Zedong remain the central influences, although classical Chinese thinkers such as Sun Tzu are also studied. According to researchers Peter Mattis and Matthew Brazil, who have studied the MSS for many years:

The MSS is a civilian agency, although it controls its own separate police force (the "State Security Police", one of the four components of the People's Police) and includes some People's Liberation Army (PLA) officers among its personnel. The MSS official uniform is dark navy blue, similar to that of the regular People's Police, with the only difference being a badge on the right arm with the Chinese characters "国安" ("State Security").

Article 4 of the Criminal Procedure Law of the People's Republic of China gives the MSS the same authority to arrest or detain people as regular police for crimes involving state security with identical supervision by the procuratorates and the courts. The National Intelligence Law of 2017 grants the MSS broad powers to conduct many types of espionage both domestically and abroad; it also gives the MSS the power to administratively detain those who impede or divulge information on intelligence work for up to 15 days.

History

Central Special Branch (1928–1936) 
In November 1927, the CCP established its first formal intelligence service, with Zhou Enlai founding the Central Special Branch (often shortened to Teke; sometimes written Special Services Section (SSS)) to conduct "special operations" work. With Xiang Zhongfa and Gu Shunzhang's assistance, Zhou designed the organization that many Chinese intelligence officers today see as the origins of their enterprise. Establishing secret bases across the Chinese territory, the Teke was composed of four sections led by Gu Shunzhang and Kang Sheng.

 1st Section, General Services Section, was responsible for the protection and safety of CCP headquarters and leaders to include making arrangements for secret meetings. 1st Section was led by Hong Yangsheng.
 2nd Section, Intelligence Section, was responsible for intelligence and counterintelligence and led by Chen Geng, later to become the CCP's Vice Minister of National Defense.
 3rd Section, Operations Section, was the infamous "Red Guard" assassination section headed by Gu Shunzhang (顾顺章) whose "dog-beating squads" were tasked to kill traitors.
 4th Section, Radio Communications Section was headed by Li Qiang (later to become PRC Minister of Foreign Trade) and responsible for communication in the underground spy network.

Zhou's primary objective was to disrupt the Kuomintang's secret police attempts to penetrate the CCP which required both a defensive counterintelligence effort to identify potentially traitorous members of the party and an offensive intelligence effort to plant spies within the Kuomintang's security and intelligence services. To prevent leaks and limit damage caused by infiltration by Nationalist spies, agents of Teke were forbidden to have any relationship with other agents making the party so compartmentalized that many never knew the name of the organization only calling it "Wu Hao's Dagger", a reference to Zhou Enlai's nom de guerre.

Based in Shanghai, Teke grew to become "a small army of messengers, people smugglers, and informers" with a constant presence in clubs, religious organizations, music groups, and brothels serving as Zhou Enlai's (and subsequently the CCP's) eyes and ears both in Shanghai and across the nation. Nonetheless, Teke had to compete with the newly established KMT Bureau of Investigation and Statistics (BIS) under the notorious Dai Li whose nickname as the "Chinese Himmler" lives on for his horrific torture record which included death in excruciating agony and forced heroin overdosing. Under Dai Li, the BIS created vast networks of 100,000 operatives across and outside the borders of China and mastered new means of intercepting communist communications — an art taught to the KMT by American cryptographer Herbert Yardley for use against the Japanese. The overwhelming advantages of the KMT were challenged only by the extensive and thorough infiltration of the security services by Teke agents including Qian Zhuangfei, Li Kenong, and Hu Di.

Gu Shunzhang, whom Zhou Enlai had chosen to head operations for Teke, would prove to be one of the most adversely consequential members of the CCP's underground intelligence ring. Having been born in Shanghai on "the wrong side of the tracks" according to French author Roger Faligot, Gu lived crudely out of bars smoking opium, having affairs, and joining the Green Gang but made a name for himself as a magician. Made a bodyguard for Mikhail Borodin, the Comintern agent and advisor to the Kuomintang from Soviet Russia, Gu was sent to Vladivostok to learn the tactics of insurrection and tradecraft of espionage as Borodin feared division between the Chinese nationalists and communists. A trained spy, Gu led Teke operations from the group's 1927 founding until 25 April 1931. 

While performing the typical magic show for young children that usually covered for his espionage missions, a nationalist informer who had turned on the CCP recognized Gu from a photograph and alerted the KMT authorities. A number of KMT agents appeared and tackled Gu, not only gleeful to have detained one of their most challenging communist adversaries but successful in turning the spymaster against the communists making Gu the most notorious intelligence traitors in modern Chinese history. As Gu provided the KMT with a flood of Teke agents' names and safe house locations, Zhou's spy inside the BIS, Qian Zhuangfei, immediately notified Zhou and Kang Shang who were able to relocate every Teke agent within two days — avoiding a potential extermination of CCP's core. Some agents, however, were located and arrested. On 21 June 1931, presumably with help from Gu's defection, the KMT captured CCP General Secretary Xiang Zhongfa hiding in a jewelry store with his cabaret dancer mistress. Despite offering to convert to the KMT party, Xiang was shot by his jailers before the received word of Chiang Kai-shek's pardon. Though the CCP's nascent intelligence branch under Kang Shang had narrowly escaped destruction, the damage done by Gu's defection and the number of communist spy arrests attrited the group until, in 1935 the CCP elected to disband it. While many of Teke's agents moved to the Red Army's Political Protection Bureau (PPB) led by Dong Fa, the PPB focused entirely on counterintelligence meaning real intelligence collection would go largely dormant until the formation of the Social Affairs Department.

Central Social Affairs Department (1936–1955) 

In 1936, the CCP established in Yan'an, Shaanxi the Social Affairs Department, often abbreviated as SAD in English, to consolidate the party's foreign intelligence and counterintelligence efforts. It wasn't until 1938 when Kang Sheng took control of the department and restructured the organization that it took its final form in the merging of the preceding Special Branch, the Political Protection Bureau (which Kang Sheng had previously headed), and the Guard Office. The Political Protection Bureau provided rear area security to communist forces prior to the Long March and close security to Mao during the march while the Guard Office established a local constabulary and counterintelligence service. Under Kang Sheng and his deputy Li Kenong, the SAD provided the CCP foreign intelligence, domestic intelligence, military security, and political security in every province in which communist forces held terrain.

The Social Affairs Department was constructed similarly to the Soviet model (as Kang had been trained by Soviet intelligence in Moscow):

 Section 1 was responsible for administration and personnel,
 Section 2 was responsible for intelligence collection,
 Section 3 was responsible for counterintelligence,
 Section 4 was responsible for intelligence analysis,
 Special section for security, and
 The "Executions Department"

From 1942 to 1944, as the Social Affairs Department expanded, Kang Sheng became paranoid and fearful of spies within his organization. Kang, known as the "Chinese Beria" abroad, frequently reminded others that political deviation was inextricably linked to being a traitorous spy, remarking "There is a close link between the twin crimes of espionage and deviationism. One is not a deviationist, as we have tended to believe, by chance or error. It is, ineluctably, dialectically, because one is a Japanese agent or a Kuomintang spy—or both. We must begin a ruthless hunt to root out these two plagues from Yan'an because, by fighting against deviationism, we weaken the clandestine plots of our enemies, and vice versa." Convinced that at least 30 percent of his organization were counterrevolutionaries and spies, Kang established a counterintelligence quota which contributed greatly to the practice of bigongxin, forcing a false confession in order to build a case against the accused. Kang's counterintelligence inquisition utilized "techniques of punishment and interrogation inspired by the millennia-long Chinese tradition of torture, updated by twentieth-century Stalinism for the requirements of the era" with torture practices including driving bamboo spikes under fingernails, inserting hair from a horse's tail into the penis, pumping high-pressure water into the vagina, cutting off the breasts of women looking for their tortured husbands, forcing the ingestion of large amounts of vinegar, applying burning incense to armpits, tying to a whipped horse's tail, and live burials. Kang's perceived connection between political deviation and traitorship led many senior leaders to avoid criticizing Kang's purges.

Known by 1944 as the "party hangman", Kang was eventually opposed by Zhou Enlai and later Mao Zedong who forced Kang to produce his own self-criticism proclaiming that perhaps only 10 percent of the comrades accused were spies and, in November 1944, relieved him of the position as head of the Social Affairs Department. Various rumors for the cause of his removal endure. One version claims that his paranoid purges made him a target of many senior communist officials, many of whom found themselves in Kang's sights. Another less likely explanation from Mao's physician, Li Zhuisui, claims that Kang suffered acute paranoia and symptoms of schizophrenia and consequently sent to a mental asylum. American intelligence reported believed Kang's downfall was the result of the recent collapse of the pro-Stalinist faction proceeding the deaths of Stalin and Beria since Kang had trained as an intelligence officer in Moscow. Li Kenong, the new head of the Social Affairs Department, developed the organization's intelligence networks and was appointed by Zhou Enlai to simultaneously serve as the nation's deputy minister of foreign affairs.

Central Investigation Department (1955–1983) 
In an effort to disaffiliate the intelligence service from Kang Sheng's paranoia-driven legacy of purges, the organization was renamed to the CCP Central Investigation Department with only one SAD branch moved out to its own organization, the Legal and Administrative Work Department.

In the 1950s, nearly every Chinese embassy abroad had an Investigation and Research Office, a cover for a group of intelligence officers belonging to the Central Investigation Department (CID) who kept close watch on diplomats and embassy staff, often sitting in on meetings and reporting back to CID headquarters' Eight Bureau (known later as the "Institute of Contemporary International Relations").

On 9 February 1962, Li Kenong died after a period of illness from the residual effects of brain damage from a fall he had sustained three years prior. Kong Yuan, Kang Sheng's former secretary and friend of Zhou Enlai, ran the service with Zou Dapeng and Luo Qingchang as his deputies.

Early in 1996, Mao Zedong and his defense chief Marshal Lin Biao plotted to overthrow army Chief of Staff and Deputy Prime Minister Luo Ruiqing who, despite being a lifelong supporter of Mao's revolution and founder of the MPS, had opposed the political training in the military instituted at Mao's directive. Eager to thieve for the second time a senior position in the security services from Luo and to gain a stronghold over the party's security apparatus, Kang Sheng prepared a traitorous dossier on Luo complete with accusations of "illicit intercourse with foreigners". Lin Biao sent for Luo's arrest, and, under appalling conditions of incarceration and interrogation, Luo attempted to commit suicide in March by throwing himself from his cell breaking two legs after which Red Guards forced him to make his own self-criticism. As Mao Zedong launched his Cultural Revolution in 1966, Kang Sheng attempted to limit the destructive influence of the revolution on his intelligence and security apparatus issuing in September the directive "Codes, telegrams, confidential documents, files, and secret archives are the essential secrets of the Party and State; the safeguarding of all of these elements is the responsibility of all cadres, revolutionary masses, students, and revolutionary teachers." Despite this, Kang Sheng soon found that the calamitous red wave that overtook Mao's China would grow beyond his control. It wouldn't be until October 1978, after Mao's death in September 1976, that Hua Guofeng and Wang Dongxing would rebuild the Central Investigative Department which was officially reestablished on 28 July 1978. The organization still lacked experience or established tradecraft which would cause them a number of embarrassments.

Vietnamese invasion of Cambodia 
The most impactful embarrassment of the newly reestablished Central Investigative Department (or Diaochabu) was their inability to predict the Vietnamese invasion of the Republic of Kampuchea (today Cambodia) in 1979. Following a visit to Democratic Kampuchea by Wang Dongxing in early November 1978, he and head of the new Central Investigative Department Luo Qinchang praised the ten-year friendship with the Khmer Rouge and helped Kaing Khek and Ta Mok to establish the neighboring communist party's notorious S-21 interrogation and extermination camp where around 20,000 Cambodians would be killed under Pol Pot's genocide. Within a month of Wang and Luo's return to China, the Socialist Republic of Vietnam launched a full-scale invasion of Kampuchea in response to a series of border attacks on the Liberation Army of Kampuchea. Perhaps by ideological closeness to Pol Pot and his followers, Chinese intelligence under the Central Investigative Department, and consequently PRC leadership, was caught by surprise by the Vietnamese invasion. Unable to contact the Khmer Rouge who, under the leadership of Ta Mok, had escaped into the jungles to organize a guerrilla resistance with only one Chinese agent carrying a defective satellite radio, a thousand Chinese military advisors fled Cambodia via Thailand and left 4,000 civilian advisors to the invading Vietnamese army. Compounding the intelligence failure, as the invasion broke the Central Investigative Department expressed confidence to Chinese leaders that the invasion would be easily repelled and that the Chinese embassy in the capital, Phnom Penh, would be unharmed.

Hoping to force a Vietnamese withdrawal from its ally Cambodia, the People's Republic of China launched their own southward invasion across the border into Vietnam in February 1979 which was withdrawn four weeks later after heavy resistance by Vietnamese guerrillas bearing Soviet and American weapons. Nonetheless, head of the CCP Deng Xiaoping supported the Khmer Rouge for another ten years in exile limiting his criticism of the two million-victim genocide assessing "the domestic counterintelligence activities created a negative atmosphere, slowing down many activities and causing social problems as well as many other problems... A thorough study of this political aspect should be undertaken and concrete measures taken."

Death of the Diaochabu 
At the end of the Cultural Revolution, as China struggled to regain its footing after a tumultuous decade, Deng Xiaoping and his fellow reformers Hu Yaobang and Zhao Ziyang endeavored down the road of governmental reform. General Secretary of the CCP Central Committee Hu Yaobang decried Kang Sheng's destructive and paranoid legacy in a speech in November 1978 enumerating many of the crimes Kang Sheng had been found guilty of, up to and through the Cultural Revolution. Kang's condemnation was bolstered by the investigation prepared by Luo Qingchang's Central Investigative Department which detailed how Kang had organized the Yan'an purges and named any of his opponents "counter-revolutionary".

Deng Xiaoping, himself a victim of Mao's Cultural Revolution, the Gang of Four, and Kang Sheng's secret police and whose brother needed to use a wheelchair after Red Guards threw him from a high window, committed to reforming the Chinese intelligence services. Firstly, Deng initiated a small but meaningful campaign to degrade Kang Sheng's legacy which began with Hu Yaobang's speech. Secondly, Deng subordinated the Central Investigative Department into a minor political organ. Finally, Deng took all the "external intelligence expertise" from the Central Investigative Department and consolidated it and all the CCP's espionage and counterintelligence functions into a new, "revolutionized" Chinese intelligence service, fitting of the new era of the Chinese "opening-up" to the world.

Ministry of State Security (1983–present) 

Proposed by Zhao Ziyang and approved at the first session of the sixth National People's Congress (NPC), the Ministry of State Security (MSS) was approved on 20 June 1983 to be a merger between the Central Investigation Department and the counterintelligence elements of the Ministry of Public Security (MPS) to "protect the security of the state and strengthen China's espionage work". The following day, the NPC appointed Ling Yun to be the first Minister of State Security which would announce its establishment on 1 July 1983. There were serious political reasons behind the merger, as Luo Qingchang, who had been Director of the CID since 1973 and was a powerful player in Chinese Communist intelligence since the 1940s, was a fierce opponent of Deng Xiaoping. Although Deng had risen to supreme power in the late 1970s, he initially couldn't remove Luo from his post, until he finally succeeded in 1983. But even after this, Luo still remained influential as an adviser on the Central Leading Group for Taiwan Affairs. Although the MSS maintains loyalty to party and ideology as a central mission, its founding represents the first time that a Chinese intelligence organ was placed under the State Council instead of the party.

The 1st Bureau of the new MSS managed internal affairs and security in each of the provinces with the help of local and regional offices. The MSS also maintained a number of concentration camps where apprehended enemy spies like the Taiwanese "Society of the Continent" network in Tianjin. The 2nd Bureau of the MSS was responsible for foreign intelligence collection beginning in the nearby capitals of Tokyo, Bangkok, and Singapore. Intelligence officers of the 2nd Bureau operated under diplomatic cover posing as advisors or secretaries to diplomats in-country. The MSS' 3rd Bureau was responsible for nearby areas the People's Republic of China wished to draw back into the CCP's control: Hong Kong, Taiwan, and Macau. The 4th Bureau focused on the technical aspects of espionage, the 5th Bureau for local intelligence, the 6th Bureau for counterintelligence, the 7th Bureau that conducted surveillance or special operations, and the 8th Bureau engaged in research through open sources (OSINT). The 8th Bureau took control over the former branch of the Central Investigative Department called the China Institutes of Contemporary International Relations (CICIR) whose members denied any connections to the Chinese intelligence apparatus. The 9th Bureau managed the threat of enemy infiltration and MSS officer defections, the 10th Bureau worked with the State Scientific & Technological Commission and the intelligence section of the Commission for Science, Technology, and Industry for National Defense (COSTIND). The 11th Bureau managed computers, networks, and information technology equipment, and finally the 12th Bureau was responsible for liaising with foreign intelligence services under the name of the Office of Foreign Affairs. Officers of the 12th Bureau worked with the CIA's David Gries, BND's Dr. Herms Bahl, MI6's Nigel Inkster, and the DGSE's Thierry Imbot while keeping them under surveillance. The so-called Office of Foreign Affairs also took up duties to surveil visiting tourists, diplomats, and journalists who began to enter the country after China's opening to the world. The MSS' first head announced "The intelligence agencies and secret services of some foreign countries have increased their spying activities against China's state secrets and are now sending agents to subvert and destroy our country."

One of the longest-serving Ministers of State Security was Jia Chunwang, a native of Beijing and a 1964 graduate of Tsinghua University, reportedly an admirer of the American Central Intelligence Agency (CIA). He served as Minister of State Security from 1985 until March 1998, when the MSS underwent an overhaul and Xu Yongyue was appointed the new head of the organization. Jia was largely responsible for the development of the MSS out of each of the provincial departments of state security, wherein many police officers found themselves intelligence officers the next day. Within the first year, Jia consolidated the security departments of Beijing, Fujian, Guangdong, Guangxi, Heilongjiang, Jiangsu, Liaoning, and Shanghai. Between 1985 and 1988 Jia had managed to incorporate those departments of Chongqing, Gansu, Hainan, Henan, Shaanxi, Tianjin, and Zhejiang. Finally, from 1990 to 1995, Jia incorporated security departments from Anhui, Hunan, Qinghai, and Sichuan provinces. Jia was then appointed to the Minister of Public Security post, after 13 years as head of the MSS. The MSS was under the influence of Zhou Yongkang until his ouster and conviction for corruption in 2014. One of the people responsible for "taking down" Zhou Yongkang was Chen Wenqing of the Central Commission for Discipline Inspection, who was nominated Minister of State Security by Chinese Premier Li Keqiang in 2016, partly as a reward for purging Zhou and his network.

Since CCP general secretary Xi Jinping assumed power in 2012, the MSS gained more responsibility over cyberespionage vis-à-vis the PLA, and has sponsored various advanced persistent threat groups such as Double Dragon. In October 2018, the Deputy Minister of State Security, Yanjun Xu, was charged with economic espionage by the United States prosecutors.

On May 28, 2021, a federal grand jury in the United States District Court for the Southern District of California returned an indictment against four People's Republic of China (PRC) citizens for their alleged roles in a long running campaign of computer network operations targeting trade secrets, intellectual property, and other high value information from companies, universities, research institutes, and governmental entities in the United States and abroad, as well as multiple foreign governments. The indictment alleges that Zhu Yunmin, Wu Shurong, Ding Xiaoyang, and Cheng Qingmin targeted the following sectors: aerospace/aviation, biomedical, defense industrial base, healthcare, manufacturing, maritime, research institutes, transportation (rail and shipping), and virus research from 2012 to 2018, on behalf of the PRC Ministry of State Security. Additionally, the indictment alleges the use of front companies by the PRC Ministry of State Security to conduct cyber espionage.

Contemporary activities 

The MSS recruits new intelligence officers primarily from major universities, police and military academies.

In March 2009 former MSS operative Li Fengzhi told the Washington Times in an interview that the MSS was engaged in counterintelligence, the collection of secrets and technology from other countries, and repressing internal dissent within China. The internal repression, according to Li, includes efforts against house churches, the underground church and the Falun Gong religious group, plus censoring the Internet to prevent China's population from knowing what is going on outside the country. Li emphasized that MSS's most important mission is, "to control the Chinese people to maintain the rule of the Communist Party."

In 2012, an executive assistant to MSS vice minister Lu Zhongwei was found to have been passing information to the CIA. Lu Zhongwei was not formally charged, but that incident was said to have infuriated Hu Jintao and led to a tightening on information dissemination and increased counterintelligence activities in Beijing and abroad.

The Shanghai State Security Bureau (SSSB) of the MSS has repeatedly been involved in both failed and successful attempts to recruit foreign agents. In 2010, the SSSB directed US citizen Glenn Duffie Shriver to apply for a position at the National Clandestine Service of the CIA. In 2017, SSSB case workers were implicated in the recruitment of US Department of State employee Candace Claiborne who was charged with obstruction of justice.

In 2013, a Chinese driver was employed by Senator Dianne Feinstein who was notified that the driver was being investigated for possible Chinese spying. At some point, he visited China and was recruited by China's MSS. He worked for Senator Feinstein for several years. The FBI concluded the driver hadn't revealed anything of substance.

During January 2017, the FBI arrested Candace Claiborne, a State Department employee who had previously worked in the American Embassy in Beijing between 2009 and 2012. In April 2019 Claiborne pleaded guilty to one count of conspiring to defraud the United States.  Prosecutors argued that she had passed sensitive information to the MSS.

Companies such as Huawei, China Mobile, and China Unicom have been implicated in MSS intelligence collection activities.

In 2017, MSS officials entered the United States on the pretense of transit visas as cultural officials. During the visit the officials made an attempt to persuade Chinese dissident Guo Wengui to return to China in order to face charges for prosecution. Guo Wengui accepted the meeting, out of apparent gratitude for one of the officials, named Liu Yanping, having previously assisted in bringing the wife of Guo Wengui to America. However, Guo Wengui recorded the conversations and alerted the FBI. Subsequently, the Chinese officials were confronted by FBI agents in Pennsylvania Station, the Chinese officials initially claimed to be cultural affairs diplomats but ultimately admitted to being security officials. The Chinese officials were given a warning for their activities in New York and were ordered to return to China. Two days later, the officials again visited the apartment of Guo Wengui once more prior to leaving the country. While at the apartment the second time, the officials reportedly ate dumplings made by the wife of Guo Wengui, and Guo Wengui walked them out of the building after again declining their offer of clemency for silence. The FBI was aware of the second visit and agents were prepared to arrest the Chinese security officials at JFK Airport prior to their Air China flight on charges of visa fraud and extortion, but arrests were not made following pressure from the State Department to avoid a diplomatic crisis. The FBI did, however, confiscate the Chinese officials’ phones before the plane took off.

In 2019, according to a report released by the European External Action Service, there were an estimated 250 MSS spies operating in Brussels.

In September 2020, a journalist, a Chinese MSS operative and her Nepalese informant were arrested in India for providing classified information about Indian army deployments in Doklam area and India's Ministry of External Affairs to two officers of Yunnan State Security Department (YSSD) of the MSS.

In December 2020, 10 MSS Operatives of Xinjiang State Security Department (XSSD) were arrested in Kabul, Afghanistan by the National Directorate of Security. During Questioning,  one of operative told the interrogators that they were gathering information about al Qaeda, Taliban and Turkistan Islamic Party in Kunar and Badakhshan provinces, and wanted to trap and assassinate high-level members of Turkistan Islamic Party. At least two of the operatives were also in contact with the Haqqani network for this job. After days of negotiations between Afghanistan and China, all of them were pardoned and were flown out of the country in a plane arranged by the Chinese government.

In February 2021, The Daily Telegraph reported that Britain had expelled three MSS agents posing as journalists.

In March 2021, at least six Chinese bloggers were arrested by MSS for 'insulting' People's Liberation Army Ground Force soldiers who died in the Galwan Valley clash. Those bloggers had suggested that the death toll of the China-India border clash was 11times higher than the official count of four.

In late April 2021, the Ministry of State Security announced that it was introducing several new measures to fight alleged infiltration by "hostile forces" of Chinese companies and other institutions. These measures include drawing up a list of companies and organizations considered to be at risk of foreign infiltration and requiring them to take security measures. In addition, staff travelling on business trips to the Five Eyes countries (the United States, United Kingdom, Australia, Canada, and New Zealand) have been ordered to report all contacts with foreign personnel, participate in anti-espionage seminars, and leaving mobile phones, laptops, and USB drives at home before traveling abroad.

In September 2022, it was reported during Congressional testimony that the FBI had informed Twitter of at least one MSS agent on its payroll.

Cyberespionage 

In 2017, the cyberespionage threat group known as Gothic Panda or APT3 was determined to have nation-state level capabilities and to be functioning on behalf of the MSS by researchers.

In 2018, the United States Department of Justice indicted two individuals of the cyber-espionage group APT10, which it stated was under the direction of the Tianjin State Security Bureau (TSSB) of MSS.

In 2020, the United States Department of Justice indicted two MSS contractors who were involved in hacking Moderna, a biotechnology company developing a vaccine for the COVID-19 pandemic. In September 2020, the Cybersecurity and Infrastructure Security Agency released a security advisory regarding hacking by groups affiliated with the MSS.

Surveillance of dissidents abroad 
In September 2020, A New York City Police Officer of Tibetan descent was arrested for gathering information on Tibetan American community for the Tibet State Security Department (TSSD) of MSS. He was also trying to recruit potential informants inside the local Tibetan community. In January 2023, federal prosecutors moved to dismiss charges against the officer.

In March 2022, the U.S. Department of Justice indicted individuals, including an MSS officer, for surveilling and conspiring to harass Chinese American pro-democracy dissidents, including political candidate Xiong Yan, Olympic figure skater Alysa Liu and her father Arthur Liu. In May 2022, the U.S. Department of Justice charged a US citizen for spying under the direction of the MSS on Hong Kong pro-democracy activists, Taiwan independence supporters, and Uyghur and Tibetan activists.

United front activities 

The ministry also carries out influence operations through so-called "united front" work, in which overseas diaspora, business contacts and NGOs are leveraged in order to gain political influence and sway policy direction to Beijing's favor. In 1939, Zhou Enlai espoused "nestling intelligence within the united front" while also "using the united front to push forth intelligence." According to Australian analyst Alex Joske, "the united front system provides networks, cover and institutions that intelligence agencies use for their own purposes." Joske added that "united front networks are a golden opportunity for Party's spies because they represent groups of Party-aligned individuals who are relatively receptive to clandestine recruitment."

Directors 
Below are the heads of the MSS and its predecessors, the Social Affairs Department and Central Investigation Department. Since 1983, agency heads carry the title of Minister of State Security (MSS), reporting directly to the State Council.

Social Affairs Department (1939–1949)

Central Investigation Department (1955–1983)

Ministry of State Security (1983–present) 

Notes: Wang Dongxing directed the Central Investigation Department while it was under Special Unit 8341 under the pressures of the Cultural Revolution. Succeeding him, Kang Sheng directed the department while it was under the Second Department of the People's Liberation Army.

Organization 
The government lists that headquarters as shared with the Ministry of Public Security adjacent to Tiannamen Square at 14 Dongchangan Avenue, Dongcheng District, Beijing. MSS facilities are reported to also operate in the northwest of Beijing in an area called Xiyuan next to the Summer Palace in Haidian District. The Federation of American Scientists website states that Xiyuan houses the headquarters of the MSS.

Additionally, In 2009, the MSS was reported by a former official to have a Counterterrorism Bureau.

Other managerial offices have been said to include:
 General Office
 Legal Department
 Political Department
 Party Committee
 Propaganda Department
 Legislative Affairs Coordination Office
 Veterans Affairs Department
 Xiyuan Management Department
Many MSS personnel are trained at the University of International Relations in Haidian, due north of MSS housing and offices in Xiyuan, as well as Jiangnan Social University.

China Institutes of Contemporary International Relations 

The Ministry of State Security operates the China Institutes of Contemporary International Relations (CICIR, pronounced ), an academic think tank on international affairs. Located in Beijing, its leaders, according to David Shambaugh "all share lengthy and shadowy careers in the intelligence services." 

CICIR was the eighth bureau of the former Central Investigation Department (CID) of the Central Committee, but became the eleventh bureau of the MSS when the CID was merged with the counter-intelligence department of the Ministry of Public Security to form the new Ministry of State Security in 1983.

Although the Chinese government has not publicly acknowledged CICIR's connection to the MSS, numerous press reports, scholars, and think tanks within and without China have detailed the relationship between the two organizations. The institute is managed by the MSS, and overseen by the Central Committee of the Chinese Communist Party. The organization itself does not speak much about its relationship with the Chinese government; however, and Chinese media reports rarely acknowledge the institution's ties with the regime.

See also 

 National Security Commission of the Chinese Communist Party
 Ministry of Public Security (China)
 Chinese intelligence activity abroad
 National Intelligence Law of the People's Republic of China 
 National Security Law of the People's Republic of China

References

Further reading 

 
 
 
  - FBIS-CHI-97-047 (1 March 1997)

External links 
 

 
Chinese intelligence agencies
State security
Law enforcement agencies of China
Law enforcement in China
National security institutions
China
1983 establishments in China
Secret police
Law enforcement in communist states
Technology transfer
Cyberwarfare by China